Israel Amoo is an Anglican bishop in Nigeria: he is Bishop of the New Bussa diocese, one of seven in the  Anglican Province of Kwara, itself one of 14 within the Church of Nigeria.

He is the current Archbishop of the Anglican Province of Kwara.

Notes

Anglican bishops of New Bussa
21st-century Anglican bishops in Nigeria
21st-century Anglican archbishops
Year of birth missing (living people)
Living people
Anglican archbishops of Kwara